James Tolbert was a Negro league catcher in the 1940s.

Tolbert made his Negro leagues debut in 1940 with the Birmingham Black Barons. He went on to play for the New York Black Yankees, and finished his career with a three-year stint with the Chicago American Giants from 1946 to 1948.

References

External links
 and Seamheads

Place of birth missing
Place of death missing
Year of birth missing
Year of death missing
Birmingham Black Barons players
Chicago American Giants players
New York Black Yankees players
Baseball catchers